Matías Nahuel González (born 20 July 1994) is an Argentine footballer who plays as a defender. He is currently a free agent.

Career
Colegiales of Primera B Metropolitana were González's first senior career club, he joined them in 2014 and made his professional debut in May versus Villa Dálmine. In 2015, González completed a move to Primera D side Claypole. He subsequently made thirty-three appearances between 2015 and 2017. González departed Claypole in 2018.

References

External links

1994 births
Living people
Place of birth missing (living people)
Argentine footballers
Association football defenders
Primera B Metropolitana players
Primera D Metropolitana players
Club Atlético Colegiales (Argentina) players
Club Atlético Claypole players